"Going Wrong" is a song by Dutch disc jockey and record producer Armin van Buuren and German disc jockey and record producer DJ Shah. It features vocals and lyrics from British singer Chris Jones. The song was released in the Netherlands by Armind and Shah-Music on 8 April 2008 as the first single from van Buuren's third studio album Imagine and as the third single from Shah's studio album Songbook.

The song has been performed live by van Buuren, Shah on keyboards and Jones for vocals during the Armin Only: Imagine tout shows in Europe, America and Australia. The first performance of the song was played on 19 April 2008 in Utrecht, in the Netherlands, in front of 20,000 fans.

Music video 
A music video to accompany the release of "Going Wrong" was first released onto YouTube on 9 April 2009.

Track listing 
 Netherlands – Armada – Digital download / CD 
 "Going Wrong" (Armin van Buuren's Radio Edit) – 3:35
 "Going Wrong" (Armin van Buuren's Extended Mix) – 6:00
 "Going Wrong" (Armin van Buuren's Universal Religion Mix) – 7:04

 United States – Ultra – Digital download / CD 
 "Going Wrong" (Armin van Buuren's Radio Edit) – 3:32
 "Going Wrong" (Original Mix) – 8:19
 "Going Wrong" (Album Mix) – 4:44
 "Going Wrong" (Armin van Buuren's Extended Mix) – 5:59
 "Going Wrong" (Armin van Buuren's Universal Religion Mix) – 7:04
 "Going Wrong" (DJ Shah's Magic Island Mix) – 8:52
 "Going Wrong" (Acoustic Mix) – 4:13

 Netherlands – Armind – Digital download / 12" 
 "Going Wrong" (Armin van Buuren's Extended Mix) – 5:58
 "Going Wrong" (Armin van Buuren's Universal Religion) – 7:04
 "Going Wrong" (DJ Shah's Magic Island Mix) – 8:51

 France – Vector – Digital download '''
 "Going Wrong" (Armin van Buuren's Radio Edit) – 3:32
 "Going Wrong" (Armin van Buuren's Extended Mix) – 5:58
 "Going Wrong" (Armin van Buuren's Universal Religion Mix) – 9:21
 "Going Wrong" (Album Mix) – 4:43
 "Going Wrong" (Acoustic Mix) – 4:12
 "Going Wrong" (Original Mix) – 8:18
 "Going Wrong" (DJ Shah's Magic Island Mix) – 8:51

Charts

References 

2008 singles
2008 songs

Armin van Buuren songs
Songs written by Armin van Buuren
Songs written by Benno de Goeij
Armada Music singles